Zara Turner is an actress from Northern Ireland.

Acting career
Turner appeared alongside Gwyneth Paltrow and John Hannah in the 1998 romantic drama film Sliding Doors, and as Dr. Angela Moloney (again with John Hannah) in the television series McCallum (1995–1998). In 2001, she appeared in the comedy film On the Nose as Carol Lenahan, with Dan Aykroyd and Robbie Coltrane.

Turner has won the Best Actress award at the Reims International Television Festival and the Golden FIPA at the 2004 Festival International de Programmes Audiovisuels.

Personal life
Turner is married to fellow actor Reece Dinsdale and they live in Yorkshire, England with their children.

Filmography
Film
 Sliding Doors (1998) as Anna
 Resurrection Man (1998) as Dr Elizabeth Ryan
 The Waiting Time (1999) as Tracy Barnes
 The Blind Date (2000) as Lucy Kennedy
 Where There's Smoke (2000) as Kate Powell
 On the Nose (2001) as Carol Lenahan
Television
 Father Ted (1995) as Laura Sweeney
 The Investigator (1997) as Major Fiona Lang
 McCallum (1998) as Dr Angela Moloney
 Touch and Go (1998 TV Movie) as Alison Wood
 Forgotten (1999) as Natalie Turner
 Any Time Now (2000) as Kate O'Dowd
 Holy Cross (2003) as Ann McClure
 The Brief (2004) as Polly Graham
 Where the Heart Is (2006) as Mary
 Midnight Man (2008) as Carolyn Raban
 The Bill (2009) as Candice Fuller
 The Body Farm (2011) as Patsy Faye

References

External links

Living people
Film actresses from Northern Ireland
Television actresses from Northern Ireland
1960s births
Date of birth missing (living people)
Actresses from Belfast